Ryerson is an incorporated township in the Almaguin Highlands region of Parry Sound District in northeastern Ontario, Canada. It had a population of 745 in the 2021 Canadian census. It was named after Egerton Ryerson, the Chief Superintendent of Education for Ontario from 1844 to 1876.

Demographics 

Mother tongue:
 English as first language: 94.9%
 French as first language: 1.5%
 English and French as first language: 0%
 Other as first language: 3.6%

Communities
 Doe Lake
 Midlothian
 Rockwynn
 Starratt
 Wisemans Corners

See also
List of townships in Ontario

References

External links

Municipalities in Parry Sound District
Single-tier municipalities in Ontario
Township municipalities in Ontario